Gustave George Bauer (April 3, 1884 – February 15, 1947) was an American wrestler who competed in the 1904 Summer Olympics. In 1904, he won a silver medal in the freestyle flyweight category. He was born in Newark, New Jersey.

References

External links
profile

1884 births
1947 deaths
Sportspeople from Newark, New Jersey
Wrestlers at the 1904 Summer Olympics
American male sport wrestlers
Olympic silver medalists for the United States in wrestling
Medalists at the 1904 Summer Olympics